Tyler Jones (born February 22, 1979) is an American former professional ice hockey winger.

Playing career
He was drafted in the first round of the 1997 NHL Entry Draft with the 16th overall pick by the Chicago Blackhawks.

After playing four seasons in the Western Hockey League, with the Spokane Chiefs and Kamloops Blazers, he made his NHL debut with the Blackhawks.  After appearing in eight games for the Blackhawks in the 1998–99 season, Jones returned to the minor leagues. He made one more appearance on an NHL roster, playing in six games for the Florida Panthers in the 2003–04 season.

He was once considered the top prospect in the Chicago Blackhawks system and comparisons were being made between him and Keith Tkachuk.

Personal life
Jones was born in Richland, Washington, but grew up in Eagle River, Alaska.

Career statistics

Regular season and playoffs

International

External links

1979 births
Anchorage Aces players
Chicago Blackhawks draft picks
Chicago Blackhawks players
Cleveland Lumberjacks players
Florida Panthers players
Ice hockey people from Washington (state)
Kamloops Blazers players
Living people
National Hockey League first-round draft picks
Norfolk Admirals players
People from Richland, Washington
San Antonio Rampage players
Spokane Chiefs players
American men's ice hockey right wingers